In the  Royal Navy's Fleet Air Arm, form A25 was a pilot's accident report. 

It features in The A25 Song, which Cyril Tawney in his book Grey Funnel Lines says probably originated in the early years of the Second World War, and describes as "the unchallenged 'anthem' of the Fleet Air Arm".

References

Fleet Air Arm
British songs
Songs of World War II